Zachary William-Jacob Allen (born August 20, 1997) is an American football defensive end for the Denver Broncos of the National Football League (NFL). He played college football at Boston College.

College career

2015
As a freshman in 2015, Allen played in all 12 games of the regular season, primarily as a member of the special teams unit. He participated in 66 plays on special teams and 46 plays at defensive end. In the first game of his collegiate career, Allen registered an assisted tackle in the season opener vs. Maine and recorded one solo tackle against Howard.

2016
In 2016, Allen played in 13 games (2016 Quick Lane Bowl), making one start against Georgia Tech in Dublin. Allen recorded 36 tackles on the season, including 19 solo tackles, and 17 assists, as well as 6.0 sacks. On the year he deflected 4 passes and had 2 fumble recoveries. In the 2016 Quick Lane Bowl, Allen played a big part in the victory over the Maryland Terrapins, recording a single-game career high of 2 sacks for a loss of 15 yards, along with 2 solo tackles.

2017
In 2017, Allen was promoted to a full-time starting defensive end and started in all 13 games (2017 Pinstripe Bowl). Allen had a career year: He had 47 solo tackles and 53 assists, with 15.5 tackles for loss, a 5.5 improvement. Allen was one of only two defensive lineman to record at least 100 tackles. Despite the leap in tackles, his sack production dropped to 4.0, 2.0 fewer than the 6.0 he recorded in 2016. Allen recorded 1 interception and deflected 3 passes.   After posting a career-high 14 tackles against Virginia Tech, Allen was named the ACC Defensive lineman of the week. After the season, Allen won the Bulger Love Award, given to New England's best offensive and defensive NCAA football players.  There was speculation that Allen would declare for the 2018 NFL Draft after his junior season, but he later announced that he would return to school for his senior year.

2018
In 2018, Allen played in all 12 regular season games; however, he did not participate in the 2018 First Responder Bowl. On the year, Allen proved to still be quite productive, recording 26 solo tackles, 35 assists, and 15.0 tackles for loss. Allen had a career-high for sacks in 2018, recording 6.5, a 0.5 improvement over his 2016 record. Allen tallied 1 interception, which was returned for 6 yards, and deflected a career-high 7 passes, doubling all of his previous years' deflected passes combined. He also had 2 fumble recoveries and his first career forced fumble.

College statistics

Professional career

Arizona Cardinals
Allen was selected by the Arizona Cardinals with the 65th overall pick in the third round of the 2019 NFL Draft.

2019 season
Following training camp, Allen was named a starting defensive end to start the season.  Allen started for the Cardinals in his debut during Week 1 of the 2019 NFL season against the Detroit Lions. During the game, Allen recorded three solo tackles. He played in the first four games before suffering a neck injury in Week 4. He missed the next six games before being placed on injured reserve on November 13, 2019.

2020 season
In Week 1 against the San Francisco 49ers, Allen recorded his first career sack on Jimmy Garoppolo during the 24–20 win. He was placed on injured reserve on October 27, 2020. He was activated on November 28, 2020. In Week 15 against the Philadelphia Eagles, Allen led the team with 11 tackles and sacked Jalen Hurts once during the 33–26 win.

2021 season
Allen entered the 2021 season as a starting defensive end. He played in 15 games with 14 starts, recording 48 tackles, four sacks, and three fumble recoveries.

Denver Broncos
On March 15, 2023, Allen signed a three-year, $45.75 million contract with the Denver Broncos.

References

External links
  Sports Reference (college)
 Arizona Cardinals Bio
 Boston College Eagles Bio

1997 births
Living people
American football defensive ends
Arizona Cardinals players
Boston College Eagles football players
Denver Broncos players
People from New Canaan, Connecticut
Players of American football from Connecticut
Sportspeople from Fairfield County, Connecticut